"One Way Ticket" is a song written by Jack Keller and Hank Hunter. It was originally performed by American singer Neil Sedaka and popularized by British disco band Eruption.

Neil Sedaka version
The track was originally performed by Neil Sedaka and included as the B-side on Sedaka's 1959 single "Oh! Carol". In 1961, the song featured in the track listing of his third studio album, Neil Sedaka Sings Little Devil and His Other Hits, but was never released as a standalone single. Despite this, the song made it to number one on the Japanese pop charts, where it was affectionately called "The Choo-Choo Train Song".

The lyrics allude to several popular songs of the late 1950s, including "Lonesome Town", "Heartbreak Hotel", "Bye Bye Love", "A Fool Such as I", and "I Cried a Tear".

Eruption version 

"One Way Ticket" was covered by British disco band Eruption for their second album, Leave a Light. The song became a big hit in Europe in the first half of 1979, topping charts in Austria and Switzerland, and reaching top 10 across Europe. "One Way Ticket" is now one of the band's trademark hits, along with their cover of "I Can't Stand the Rain".

Track listing 
7" Single (1979)
A. "One Way Ticket" – 3:35
B. "Left Me in the Rain" – 3:54

12" Single (1979)
A. "One Way Ticket" (Long Version) – 5:05
B. "Left Me in the Rain" – 3:54

CD Single (1994)
 "One Way Ticket" (Radio Version) – 3:58
 "One Way Ticket" (Club Mix) – 5:58
 "One Way Ticket" (Never Return Mix) – 5:44
 "If I Loved You Less" – 4:08

Chart performance

Weekly charts

Year-end charts

References

External links
 Lyrics of this song
 
 

1959 songs
1979 singles
Disco songs
Number-one singles in Austria
Number-one singles in Switzerland
Songs written by Jack Keller (songwriter)
Song recordings produced by Frank Farian
RCA Records singles
Ariola Records singles
Hansa Records singles
Neil Sedaka songs
Eruption (band) songs
Songs about trains